Puuc is the name of either a region in the Mexican state of Yucatán or a Maya architectural style prevalent in that region.  The word puuc is derived from the Maya term for "hill".  Since the Yucatán is relatively flat, this term was extended to encompass the large karstic range of hills in the southern portion of the state, hence, the terms Puuc region or Puuc hills.  The Puuc hills extend into northern Campeche and western Quintana Roo.

The term Puuc is also used to designate the architectural style of ancient Maya sites located within the Puuc hills, hence, the term Puuc architecture.  This architectural style began at the end of the Late Classic period but experienced its greatest extent during the Terminal Classic period.

Puuc architecture
In the florescence of Puuc architecture (such as at the ancient Maya site of Uxmal) buildings were decorated with carefully cut veneer stones set into a concrete core. The lower portion of the façades are blank with a flat surface of rectangular blocks punctuated by doorways, while the upper façade is richly decorated with intricate stone mosaics, often alternating repeated geometric elements with more elaborate figurative sculpture.  Long-nosed masks (commonly believed to be of the Maya rain god Chaac) are found on many Puuc buildings.

Beyond the impressive decorative elements of Puuc architecture, the use of a concrete core is also considered an architectural advance beyond the earlier Maya technique of using larger stones (set on top of one another in lime and mud mortar) for structural support.  The concrete core-veneer masonry allowed for slightly larger and more stable interior rooms.  Many corbelled vaults in the Puuc style remain standing, even when most of the veneer stones have fallen away.

The most famous of the Maya sites exhibiting the Puuc architectural style is Uxmal; other major Puuc-style sites in the region include Labna, Kabah, Sayil and Xlapak.  The architectural style is also seen at Kiuic, Bolonchen, Chunhuhub, Xculoc, and many smaller ruins.  The transition from earlier Classic Period architecture to Puuc style core-veneer masonry is well documented at the site of Oxkintok.  To the south, the style can be found in Edzná; and to the east at Chichen Itza (outside of the Puuc Hills region).

As stated by the Maya explorer Teobert Maler, who explored this zone intensively, the area around the site of Dolores is full of ruins. The recently completed Chunhuaymil project compiled data of the remaining Puuc architecture of 19 archaeological sites located in a 100 square kilometers area.

Puuc Biocultural State Reserve
Puuc Biocultural State Reserve, also known as Kaxil Kiuic reserve (Spanish Reserva Estatal Biocultural del Puuc) was designated in 2011. It covers an area of 1358.93 km². The reserve was created to protect the region's archeological sites as well as its biodiverse flora and fauna. The reserve is home to 247 bird, 63 mammal, 52 reptile, and 14 amphibian species. Five species of large felines, including jaguars, live in the reserve.

References

Andrews, George F. (1999) Pyramids, Palaces, Monsters and Masks: The Golden Age of Maya Architecture. Labyrinthos Press, Culvert City.
Carmean, Kelli, Nicholas Dunning and Jeff K. Kowalski. 2004 High times in the hill country: a perspective from the Terminal Classic Puuc region. In, The Terminal Classic in the Maya Lowlands: Collapse, Transition, and Transformation. Arthur A. Demarest, Prudence M. Rice, and Don S. Rice, eds. pp. 424–449.  University Press of Colorado, Boulder.
Dunning, Nicholas P. 1992 Lords of the Hills: Ancient Maya Settlement in the Puuc Region, Yucatán, Mexico. Centre d'Etudes Mexicaines et Centraméricaines, Mexico.
Dunning, Nicholas P. and Jeff K. Kowalski. 1994 Lord of the Hills: Classic Maya settlement patterns and political iconography in the Puuc Region, Mexico. Ancient Mesoamerica 5(1):63–95.  Cambridge, England.
Gendrop, Paul 1998 Rio Bec, Chenes, and Puuc Styles in Maya Architecture. Labyrinthos. 239 p., Culver City.
 Merk, Stephan 2011 The Long Silence. Sabana Piletas and Its Neighbours: An Architectural Survey of Maya Ruins in Northeastern Campeche, México. Markt Schwaben, Germany: Verlag Anton Saurwein.
Mills, Lawrence, (ed.) 1979 The Puuc: New Perspectives: Papers Presented at the Puuc Symposium, Central College, May, 1977. Central College Press, Pella, IA.
Pollock, Harry E. D. 1980 Puuc: An Architectural Survey of the Hill Country of Yucatan and Northern Campeche, Mexico. Harvard University, Peabody Museum of Archaeology and Ethnology. Cambridge, MA.
Prem, Hanns J. (ed.) 1994 Hidden Among the Hills: Maya Archaeology of the Northwest Yucatan Península. Hanns J. Prem, ed. pp. 247–288  Acta Mesoamericana, 7. Verlag von Flemming, Möckmühl.
Sabloff, Jeremy A. and Gair Tourtellot. 1991 Ancient Maya City of Sayil: The Mapping of a Puuc Region Center. Publication, 60, Tulane University, Middle American Research Institute, New Orleans.
Tourtellot, Gair. 2001 "Puuc", in The Oxford Encyclopedia of Mesoamerican Cultures: The Civilizations of Mexico and Central America. David Carrasco, ed. v. 3. pp. 42–43.  Oxford University Press, Oxford, England.

External links
 From the online newspaper Diario de Yucatan
Photo tours of Maya sites, including several from the Puuc region.
Academic report on the recent archaeological survey between the Puuc sites of Labna and Kiuic.
Puuc web site at Reed College. Over a thousand 19th – 21st century photographs of Puuc sites.

Maya architecture
Hills of Mexico
Yucatán Peninsula
Geography of Campeche
Geography of Quintana Roo
Geography of Yucatán
Geography of Mesoamerica
History of the Yucatán Peninsula
Maya Classic Period
Architectural styles